Garra compressus is a species of ray-finned fish in the genus Garra which occurs only in Manipur in eastern India.

References

Garra
Taxa named by Laishram Kosygin
Fish described in 1998